Herman Colin Bartlett (5 March 1892 – 8 August 1966) was an Australian rules footballer who played with Fitzroy and Carlton in the Victorian Football League (VFL).

Notes

External links 

Herman Bartlett's profile at Blueseum

1892 births
1966 deaths
Australian rules footballers from Victoria (Australia)
Fitzroy Football Club players
Carlton Football Club players
Northcote Football Club players